Ivan Smiljanić (born 16 April 1981) is a rower who represented the combined team of Serbia and Montenegro at the 2000 Summer Olympics in Sydney.

Career
Smiljanić was born in 1981 in Belgrade, Yugoslavia. He rowed for the California Golden Bears, Berkeley (USA) and served as their team captain before graduating with a degree in economics and political science. While at Cal he won two gold medals as well as a bronze at national championships on top of the two gold and silver medals he won at Pac-10s. Smiljanić also rowed in the 2000 Olympic Games as a member of the Serbian National Team in the coxless four. He won two gold, two silver and a bronze at World Rowing Junior Championships.

Smiljanić coached Oakland Strokes, a high school rowing club, from 2006 to 2010.

References

Living people
1981 births
Serbian male rowers
Olympic rowers of Serbia and Montenegro
Rowers at the 2000 Summer Olympics

External Links